Mall St. Vincent is an enclosed shopping mall located off Interstate 49 at 1133 St. Vincent Avenue in Shreveport, Louisiana. It opened in 1976 on the 100-acre site of the original St. Vincent's Academy, a Catholic girls' school built by the Daughters of the Cross, from which it gets its name. The mall's main anchor store is Dillard's.

In 2014, the city government funded $16.5 million into Mall St Vincent, but the long-term fate of the facility remains in doubt. An 
outdoor fountain included in the remodeling project was by 2017 crumbling and without water, with plants surrounding the structure having died. In 2017, Grimaldi's Pizzeria and Gymboree closed their Mall St. Vincent operations, and Sears was reportedly in jeopardy at the time of the closing announcement in June 2018. Online shopping and changing consumer habits have affected shopping malls; as many as one in four could close within the next five years.

On June 6, 2018, it was announced that Sears would be closing in September 2018.

References

External links
Official site

Shopping malls in Louisiana
Buildings and structures in Shreveport, Louisiana
Shopping malls established in 1977
1977 establishments in Louisiana
Kohan Retail Investment Group